Mula sa Masa, para sa Masa (Cebuano: Gikan sa Masa, para sa Masa) is a weekly public service and talk television program hosted by Philippine President Rodrigo Duterte together with Rocky Ignacio from the People's Television Network. The program tackles the week's most prominent issues as well as explains the policies and showcases the projects of the Duterte administration. The show features a question-and-answer portion during which Duterte himself responds to comments, complaints and questions sent in by viewers.

The program premiered on May 19, 2017, and is supposed to air every Friday at 7:00 p.m. (UTC +08) on the government-owned People's Television Network. In the pilot and so far only episode of the program, Duterte discussed the appointment of Roy Cimatu as the new Department of Environment and Natural Resources (DENR) secretary, replacing Gina Lopez.

The program is supposed to be a spin-off of the long-running television program "Gikan sa Masa, para sa Masa", a weekly talk show that aired every Sunday morning over ABS-CBN Davao when Duterte was still the mayor of Davao City and until the start of his presidential campaign, and again in 2023, but this time it will be aired on SMNI every Sunday evenings and reverting to its original title.

In August 2016, a state-owned free tabloid newspaper, named after the program's title, was introduced to the public.

See also
People's Television Network

References

Television spin-offs
2017 Philippine television series debuts
2017 Philippine television series endings
People's Television Network original programming
Presidency of Rodrigo Duterte
Philippine television talk shows
Presidential Communications Group (Philippines)